The Thailand women's national ice hockey team is the women's national ice hockey team in Thailand.

Tournament record

World Championships

Top division
 1990 Canada through  2019 Finland – Did not participate

International competitions
2014 IIHF Women's Challenge Cup of Asia Division I. Finish: 2nd
2015 IIHF Women's Challenge Cup of Asia Division I. Finish: 2nd
2016 IIHF Women's Challenge Cup of Asia Division I. Finish: 2nd
2017 Asian Winter Games. Finish: 5th
2017 IIHF Women's Challenge Cup of Asia. Finish: 2nd
2018 IIHF Women's Challenge Cup of Asia. Finish: 3rd
2019 IIHF Women's Challenge Cup of Asia. Finish: 1st

All-time record against other nations
Last match update: 10 March 2022

References

Ice hockey in Thailand
Ice hockey
Women's national ice hockey teams in Asia